Eurybia integrifolia, (formerly Aster integrifolius) commonly called the thickstem aster, is an herbaceous perennial in the family Asteraceae. It is native to the western United States where it grows primarily in the Rocky Mountains, the Great Basin, and the Sierra Nevada in Washington, Idaho, Montana, Wyoming, Utah, Oregon, Nevada, and California.

References

External links
 

Flora of the Western United States
Plants described in 1840
integrifolia